Smile or Die is the second studio album by American indie-folk group Insomniac Folklore. It was recorded by Chris George and Tyler Hentschel at Full Circle Studio in Humboldt County, California and was released in September 2005. This album is mostly guitar and vocals with minimal accompaniment.

Smile or Die was on the HM Magazine top 5 staff pics for record of the year for 2005.

Track listing

Personnel
Insomniac Folklore
 Tyler Hentschel – Vocals, Guitar, Organ, Cello, lyricist, composer, songwriter
 Britta Cooper – backing vocals on "Intro/Wrists"

References

2005 albums
Insomniac Folklore albums